Time Supper Club is the first supper club in Montreal, Quebec, Canada which mostly featured R&B and house music. The supper club  was known for attracting A-list celebrities, world-renowned Dj's and artists, most eventful Grand Prix celebrations, as well as being one of Montreal's hottest weekend hotspots. Located between downtown and the Old Port of Montreal at 997, rue Saint-Jacques, Time Supper Club used to open Friday and Saturday nights as a sit-down dinner and gradually turned into a night club.

Artists who Performed at Time Supper Club 

 Snoop Dogg
 Lady Gaga
 Fergie
 Black Eyed Peas
 Drake
 Tiësto
 Avicii
 Edward Maya
 Timbaland
 LMFAO
 T. Mills
 Bob Sinclar
 Wale
 Steve Aoki
 Sean Kingston
 Dada Life
 Kelis
 Trey Songz
 Felix da Housecat
 Vandalism (band)
 Joachim Garraud
 DJ Sasha
 Macy Gray

See also
 List of supper clubs

References

 Fodor's Montreal & Quebec City 2011
 Askmen.com's Top 10: Montreal New Year's Eve Events 
 Frommer's Montréal and Québec City 2011
 Askmen.com Montreal F1 Parties
 About.com Time Supper Club's Stevie B Hamron on Montreal
 Le Time Supper Club 
 Time Supper Club: Hats Off to the Races for the 8th Year Running
 Time Supper Club @ ClubZone

External links
 Time Supper Club

2002 establishments in Quebec
Electronic dance music venues
Nightclubs in Montreal
Supper clubs
Ville-Marie, Montreal